William Henry Mead (January 11, 1921 – February 25, 1974) was bishop of the Episcopal Diocese of Delaware, serving as diocesan from 1968 to 1974.

Biography
Mead was born in Detroit, Michigan on January 11, 1921. He was educated at Cranbrook School and later studied at the University of Michigan, and then Lake Forest College, from where he graduated with a Bachelor of Arts in 1943. He then had a brief business career in the automobile industry. He also graduated from the Virginia Theological Seminary in 1950 with a Bachelor of Divinity.

Mead was ordained deacon in 1950 and priest in 1951. On July 1, 1950, he married Katherine Baldwin Lloyd. He served as assistant priest of Christ Church Cranbrook in Bloomfield Hills, Michigan. In 1952 he became rector of St Paul's Church in Alexandria, Virginia, while in 1957 he became the associate director of the Parishfleld Community Church in Brighton, Michigan. Between 1959 and 1964, he was the rector of the Church of St John the Evangelist in Saint Paul, Minnesota. On May 10, 1964, he became Dean of Christ Church Cathedral in St. Louis, Missouri.

He was elected Bishop of Delaware on June 28, 1968, and was consecrated bishop on November 15 of the same year by Presiding Bishop John E. Hines in Christ the King Catholic Church. He retained the post till his death on February 25, 1974, due to a heart attack in Wilmington, Delaware.

References 

1921 births
1974 deaths
Clergy from Detroit
University of Michigan alumni
Lake Forest College alumni
Virginia Theological Seminary alumni
20th-century American Episcopalians
Episcopal bishops of Delaware
20th-century American clergy